is a Japanese football player.

Playing career
Sotaro Izumi played for the J3 League club YSCC Yokohama during the 2015 season.

Club statistics
Updated to 20 February 2017.

References

External links

1992 births
Living people
Kwansei Gakuin University alumni
Association football people from Kanagawa Prefecture
Japanese footballers
J3 League players
YSCC Yokohama players
Suzuka Point Getters players
Association football midfielders